Black Butterfly is a 2003 album by Tsakani Mhinga. It won the South African Music Awards Best R&B Album in 2004.

Track listing
Black Butterfly	
In Dis Piece	
Tell Him (How I Feel)	
Initi8	
Beddaman	
Somewhere Over The Rainbow	
The Way You Love Me	
It's My Life	
Everything 'Bout You	
Close Your Eyes	
Free Me	
Friday Night	
How Do You Feel	
The Real Thing (Original Mix)

References

2003 albums
Tsakani Mhinga albums